Timeline of anthropology, 1950–1959

Events
1959
Mary Leakey discovers the first Paranthropus boisei cranium

Publications
1956
Nuer Religion by E. E. Evans-Pritchard

1959
Political Leadership Among Swat Pathans, by Fredrik Barth
The Inland Whale, by Theodora Kroeber

Births

Deaths
1956
Marcel Griaule
F.W. Hodge
Rafael Karsten
Siegfried Nadel
1959
Edward Winslow Gifford
Paul Radin

Anthropology by decade
Anthropology
Anthropology timelines
1950s decade overviews